Cyclospermum (also, Ciclospermum) is a small genus of plants in the family Apiaceae. There are three species, including the well-known weed Cyclospermum leptophyllum, the marsh parsley or fir-leafed celery.

References

External links
 Jepson Manual Treatment
 USDA Plants Profile

Apioideae